Pultenaea prolifera, commonly known as Otway bush-pea, is a species of flowering plant in the family Fabaceae and is endemic to the south coast of Victoria. It is an erect shrub with needle-shaped leaves, and yellow and red pea-like flowers arranged singly in leaf axils on the ends of short side branches.

Description
The flowers are arranged in one or two leaf axils on the ends of short side branches with hairy, broadly egg-shaped bracts at the base. The fruit is a pod surrounded by the remains of the sepals.

Taxonomy and naming
Pultenaea prolifera was first formally described in 1922 by Herbert Bennett Williamson in the Proceedings of the Royal Society of Victoria from specimens collected near the Otway Forest in 1921.

Distribution and habitat
This pultenaea grows in the heathy understorey of forest in near-coastal areas of western Victoria.

References

prolifera
Flora of Victoria (Australia)
Plants described in 1922